KZLU may refer to:

 KZLU-LP, a radio station (102.1 FM) licensed to serve Baton Rouge, Louisiana, United States
 KYUA, a radio station (88.5 FM) licensed to serve Inyokern, California, United States, which held the call sign KZLU from 2005 to 2016